I'm Sorry may refer to:

Film, TV and games
 I Am Sorry, a 2012 Nepali film
 I'm Sorry (TV series) starring Andrea Savage on TruTV
 I'm Sorry (video game), a 1985 arcade game

Music
 I'm Sorry, an EP by The Neighbourhood

Songs
 "I'm Sorry" (Brenda Lee song), 1960
 "I'm Sorry" (Delfonics song), 1968
 "I'm Sorry" (John Denver song), 1975
 "So. Central Rain (I'm Sorry)", a 1984 song by R.E.M.
 "Nick Clegg Says I'm Sorry (The Autotune Remix)", a song featuring Nick Clegg, made by The Poke
 "I'm Sorry", by Benny Benassi from Hypnotica
 "I'm Sorry", by Blink-182 from Dude Ranch
 "I'm Sorry", by Bo Diddley from Go Bo Diddley
 "I'm Sorry", by Brokencyde from I'm Not a Fan, But the Kids Like It!
 "I'm Sorry", by Dannii Minogue from Club Disco
 "I'm Sorry", by Demi Lovato from Dancing with the Devil... the Art of Starting Over
 "I'm Sorry", by Evergrey from Recreation Day
 "I'm Sorry", by Hall & Oates from Whole Oats
 "I'm Sorry", by Hothouse Flowers from People
 "I'm Sorry", by Joyner Lucas from 508-507-2209
 "I'm Sorry", by Just a Man
 "I'm Sorry", by the Partysquad, originally by Monsta Boy titled "Sorry (I Didn't Know)"
 "I'm Sorry", by Roxette from Crash! Boom! Bang!
 "I'm Sorry", by Shaggy from Shaggy & Friends
 "I'm Sorry", by The Platters, 1957
 "I'm Sorry", by The Word Alive
 "I'm Sorry", by Vixen from Live & Learn

See also
 Condolences
 Congratulations… I'm Sorry, an album by Gin Blossoms
 "Hard to Say I'm Sorry", a 1982 song by Chicago
 Regret (emotion)
 Sorry (disambiguation)